Barry Strauss Carl (born April 20, 1950) is an American voice-over actor and musician best known as the bass of the a cappella vocal band Rockapella while the group was house band on the PBS children's geography game show Where in the World Is Carmen Sandiego?. He was a member of Rockapella from 1988 until he left the group in 2002. Carl is known for his signature deep voice, which he used during his years with the band to create an almost instrumental sounding bass.

As a voice-over artist, Carl has done hundreds of television and radio commercials for such companies as Taco Bell, Charmin, Mounds/Almond Joy, Doritos, and Volkswagen; promos for Syfy, Comedy Central, Nickelodeon, The Discovery Channel, and PBS; theatrical trailers; industrial narrations; books on tape; public service announcements; internet commercials; and voices for animated characters in anime, video games, and commercials.

Early life
Born in Portland, Oregon to a father who was a jazz musician and a mother who was an artist focusing mostly on sculpting, Carl's parents moved to Los Angeles, where he grew up, before he was 2 years old. In 1958, at age 8, Carl began to play the tenor saxophone, but stopped a year later and switched to the French horn at age 10. He won many awards and competitions for his horn playing including the Los Angeles Music Guild Award (1963), the First Los Angeles Horn Club Award (1965), and the Coleman Awards twice (1966, 1967). It also brought him many opportunities; Carl played with every pro and semipro ensemble in Los Angeles, played the Strauss' Horn Concerto No. 1 at his high school graduation, was the principal horn in the American youth symphony under Mehli Mehta as well as an extra horn with the Los Angeles Philharmonic, the Cleveland Orchestra, and the American Ballet Theatre, and spent three summers on scholarship at the Music Academy of the West in Santa Barbara under Maurice Abravanel, where he performed Mozart's Sinfonia Concertante for Wind Quartet and Orchestra, Robert Schumann's Konzertstück for Four Horns and Orchestra, Antonín Dvořák's Serenade for Wind Instruments, and Mozart's Serenade No. 10 for Winds.

Carl won a scholarship to the Juilliard School in 1966 at age 16, the youngest hornist ever admitted to the school on scholarship at the time, but waited until he graduated from Ulysses S. Grant High School in 1968 to move to New York and attend the school. He studied with Rainier DeIntinis, who was the 3rd chair hornist in the New York Philharmonic while he taught. Carl earned two degrees from Juilliard, a Bachelor of Music in 1972 and a Master of Music in 1973, and played in the Juilliard Orchestra, many Broadway shows, the Merce Cunningham Dance Company, and three seasons with the New Jersey Symphony Orchestra during his years there. He quit playing the horn at age 28 to further pursue his passion for singing.

Singing
Carl began studying voice in 1975 and went back to Juilliard a year later at age 26 as a singer in their American Opera Center (AOC) professional program. He studied with Nina Hinson, Raymond Buckingham, Dan Merriman, Armen Boyajian, Robin M. Williams, and briefly with Richard Torigi while at the AOC, which ended after just a few lessons when he told Carl, "You have a very ugly voice and should quit." He spent three summers at the Aspen Music Festival where he sang in his first opera and made his solo debut as the Basso Profundo soloist in the world premiere of Krzysztof Penderecki's Utrenja II for Five Soloists, Boy's Choir, Chorus, and Orchestra. After a summer apprenticeship at the Central City Opera in Central City, Colorado in 1978, Carl joined the New York City Opera at age 28 for four seasons, where he sang as chorister and made his solo debut there in the dual roles of Alcindoro and Benoît in La bohème. For several years afterward, he continued to sing with orchestras such as the Juilliard Orchestra, the New York Philharmonic, and the American Symphony Orchestra; with many small ensembles such as Vocal Jazz, Inc., the Cathedral Singers at the Cathedral of St. John the Divine, and the New York Choral Soloists; in regional opera playing roles such as Méphistophélès in Faust, Sarastro in Die Zauberflöte, Zaccaria in Nabucco, Seneca in L'incoronazione di Poppea, and Theseus in A Midsummer Night's Dream; and did musical and regional theater.

Rockapella

In the spring of 1988, while sitting in the Pier 72 Diner on 72nd Street and West End Avenue in New York City, Carl read an ad for a bass in an a cappella group called Rockapella in Backstage. He answered the ad and auditioned for Sean Altman and Elliott Kerman, but did not hear back from the two for months. That summer, while Carl worked with the Minnesota Opera, Altman and Kerman asked him to be in the group and sent him a stack of music to learn. Upon receiving and looking over the music, Carl decided he didn't want to sing barbershop tunes and Christmas songs, so he sent the music back and told the pair he had changed his mind about taking the position. Altman then called Carl and persuaded him to try it, asserting that it would be a minimal time commitment. He was a member of Rockapella for 14 years, two years longer than Altman's own membership. Carl's first gig with Rockapella was singing the "Star Spangled Banner" at a New York Rangers game at Madison Square Garden, which the group had been hired to do for 12 games; the quartet was booed throughout the entire song and relieved of their obligation to sing at the next 11 games. Upon looking back at the experience, both Carl and Altman have stated the negative feedback was because of their slow arrangement of the national anthem. Over the 14 years he spent with the band, Carl wrote five songs on the 15 CDs he appears on with Rockapella: "Give" (with Masahiro Ikumi and Scott Leonard), "Island Christmas" (Bash!), "Fat Jack & Bonefish Joe" (with Lisa S. Johnson), "Quiet Sensation" (Vocobeat), and "Bored & Stroked" (Out Cold); arranged the group's cover of "Love Me Tender" (Lucky Seven); and performed numerous bass solos for songs both on and not included in Rockapella's albums. He recorded many of his parts for these albums in his recording studio The BassMint, "a luxurious pro studio on the green banks of the Hackensack River" as Carl describes it.

In late 2002, Carl decided to retire from Rockapella to pursue other opportunities; his last concert with the group was on July 14, 2002, in Burbank, California at the Starlight Bowl, but appeared as the principal bass singer on the group's album Smilin', which was released a month later. Carl has, however, continued to work with music. He released a solo CD in 2004 titled The SoLow Project, which contains 20 songs split into four sections of Negro spirituals, sea chanties, a collection of songs by Jacques Ibert, and a song cycle by Modest Mussorgsky. He also appeared on movie soundtracks as an ensemble singer for such films as Corpse Bride and Nine; in 2007 he appeared in the independent movie The Wedding Weekend as a tough guy in prison who likes to sing. In the fall of 2009, Carl filmed a scene for the Will Ferrell movie The Other Guys, released on August 6, 2010, in which he is an a cappella singer in a bar. Since 2008 Carl has gotten back together with Steve Keyes, Kerman, and Altman on three occasions, billing themselves as XRP. This regrouping of the 1988–1991 line up of Rockapella was originally scheduled to occur only twice: once as a practice gig on July 26, 2008, and a second time at the 2008 A Cappellastock in Ogden, Utah on August 23. However, XRP got together for a third show on April 17, 2009, and sang a song written by Carl and Altman on the Schoolhouse Rock!: Earth Rock soundtrack called "You Oughta Be Savin' Water"; Carl is also one of the singers on another Altman song on the same album titled "Save the Ocean". In addition to singing with old friends at various gigs, Carl sings in a pro chorus with the New York Philharmonic and the American Symphony Orchestra from time to time, and every now and then concertizes with Rockland Vocal Arts, a small ensemble of singers. Carl also privately teaches a limited number of vocal students and coaches vocal groups.

Voice-over artist
Starting in 1984, Carl has done voice over work for many forms of media. He started out freelance for about five years, and then signed on with William Morris Agency for ten years. Since then he has been with Abrams Artists Agency. At the 2007 Promax Awards, two of Carl's SciFi Channel promos won International Gold Medals. For many years he was the voice of the papa bear in the Charmin television ads; Carl's voice has also been used as the voice for the following various animated animals and objects: bear, pig, clam, duck, cockroach, horse, penguin, giraffe, moose, whale, shark, bass (fish), Sasquatch, water droplet, water jug, a jug of Koolaid, a toilet, a germ, a recycling bin, and an echo in a Pepsi commercial. In addition to his aforementioned private singing lessons, Carl teaches voice-over technique.

Carl started playing the bass guitar in 1986, was the bassist on The SoLow Project, and continues to play today. He also writes stories and articles for various publications, is currently co-producing TV show pilots and concepts in partnership with Hilton Media, is a frequent judge at a cappella competitions such as the International Championship of Collegiate A Cappella and the Harmony Sweeps Finals, and rides a 2016 Kawasaki Concours he calls "The Gray Ghost". He also works as a Certified Core Energetics Practitioner (CCEP) in Rockland County, NY.

Filmography

Video games

Discography

Solo

CDs

Guest appearance/various releases

Soundtracks and appearances

With Rockapella

Domestic releases

International releases

Compilations

Various releases

References

External links
http://imdb.com/name/nm0137265

1950 births
Living people
American basses
American male pop singers
American opera singers
Juilliard School alumni
Music Academy of the West alumni
American male voice actors
Musicians from Los Angeles
Musicians from Portland, Oregon
Singers from California
Singers from Oregon
Rockapella members
Classical musicians from California
Classical musicians from Oregon